
Year 353 (CCCLIII) was a common year starting on Friday (link will display the full calendar) of the Julian calendar. At the time, it was known as the Year of the Consulship of Magnentius and Decentius (or, less frequently, year 1106 Ab urbe condita). The denomination 353 for this year has been used since the early medieval period, when the Anno Domini calendar era became the prevalent method in Europe for naming years.

Events

By place

Roman Empire 
 Battle of Mons Seleucus: Emperor Constantius II defeats the usurper Magnentius, who commits suicide in Gaul in order to avoid capture. Constantius becomes sole emperor, and reunifies the Roman Empire.
 Constantius II sends his official Paulus Catena to Britain, to hunt down the opponents supporting Magnentius. Flavius Martinus, vicarius of Britain and supporter of Constantius, opposes the persecutions; he is then accused by Catena of being a traitor. In response, Martinus tries to kill Catena with a sword; he fails and then commits suicide.
 Constantius II assembles a conciliabulum at Arles, and condemns Athanasius as Patriarch of Alexandria.

By topic

China 
 Wang Xizhi, Chinese calligrapher, produces "Preface to the Poems Composed at the Orchid Pavilion" in running script style. It becomes a model for future calligraphers.

Births 
 Saint Paulinus (Paolino), Bishop of Nola (d. 431)
 Saint Vigilius, Bishop of Trent (d. 405)

Deaths 
 August 11 – Magnentius, Roman usurper (b. 303)
 August 18 – Magnus Decentius, brother and Caesar of Magnentius
 Flavius Martinus, vicarius of Roman Britain
 Zhang Chonghua, ruler of Former Liang (b. 327)

References